Weng'an County is a county in Qiannan Buyei and Miao Autonomous Prefecture, Guizhou, China.

Weng'an has an area of 1973.8 square kilometers and a population of 460,600 as of 2003.

Gallery

Climate

See also
2008 Weng'an riot

References

External links

County-level divisions of Guizhou
Qiannan Buyei and Miao Autonomous Prefecture